The Essential "Weird Al" Yankovic is a two disc compilation album by "Weird Al" Yankovic. A limited edition "3.0" version of the album has a third disc. It is published by Sony Music's Legacy Recordings as part of their The Essential series. Yankovic selected the songs for inclusion on the album after seeking fan feedback for the choice between one of two polkas.

Track listing

Disc one

Disc two

Disc three (3.0 version only)

References

"Weird Al" Yankovic compilation albums
2009 greatest hits albums
Legacy Recordings compilation albums